Blue Sky on Mars is the sixth album by alternative rock musician Matthew Sweet. It was released on Zoo Entertainment in 1997.

Cover
The cover of the album features an image by Viking 1, the first spacecraft to land on Mars; the album's liner notes include additional imagery of the planet's landscape as taken by the spacecraft on July 20, 1976. The text on the cover was done by fantastic artist Roger Dean, best known for his work on album covers for bands such as Yes. The album's title comes from the tour in the film Total Recall.

Release
The album was met with little commercial success, but favorable reviews. Critic Jim Farber of Entertainment Weekly gave the album a "B", writing that it "matched his usual sugary melodies to denser production, hinting at everything from the Beach Boys to '80s new wave", and adding that "[Sweet's] power pop still has the knack". The A.V. Club wrote that the album contained "nice, sugary three-minute pop singles that instantly lodge themselves in your cranium", adding that it is "a slight but worthy addition to his terrific catalog".

Details
The song "Hollow" was featured in the film The Game, and "Come to California" was featured in the film Nancy Drew.

Track listing 
All songs written by Matthew Sweet except "Back To You" written by Ric Menck and Matthew Sweet.
 "Come to California" - 3:31
 "Back to You" - 3:10
 "Where You Get Love" - 3:35
 "Hollow" - 4:03
 "Behind the Smile" - 2:23
 "Until You Break" - 4:50
 "Over It" - 1:37
 "Heaven and Earth" - 2:32
 "All Over My Head" - 3:04
 "Into Your Drug" - 2:39
 "Make Believe" - 1:50
 "Missing Time" - 3:15

Japanese bonus tracks
"If It's Happening You'll Know" - 3:10
 "Close Inside" - 4:32
 "Final Hour" - 3:37

Personnel
Matthew Sweet – vocals, bass, guitar, synthesizer, theremin
Brendan O'Brien – piano, mellotron, guitar, synthesizer, electric harpsichord, drums
Stuart Johnson – drums
Ric Menck – drums
Tony Marsico - Bass
Production notes:
Brendan O'Brien – mixing, producer
Matthew Sweet – producer, arranger
Nick DiDia – engineer
Bob Ludwig – mastering
David Schiffman – recording technician
Caram Costanzo – second engineer
Martyn Dean – design
Roger Dean – lettering
Jeff Bender – photography

References

1997 albums
Matthew Sweet albums
Albums produced by Brendan O'Brien (record producer)
Zoo Entertainment (record label) albums
Albums produced by Matthew Sweet
Albums with cover art by Roger Dean (artist)